Chengara Surendran (born 31 January 1968) is an Indian politician who was a member of the 14th Lok Sabha of India. He represented the Adoor constituency of Kerala and is a member of the Communist Party of India (CPI) political party.

External links
 Members of Fourteenth Lok Sabha - Parliament of India website

Communist Party of India politicians from Kerala
Living people
1968 births
India MPs 2004–2009
People from Pathanamthitta
Lok Sabha members from Kerala
India MPs 1998–1999
Candidates in the 2014 Indian general election
Communist Party of India candidates in the 2014 Indian general election